This is a list of coins of Madagascar.

Malagasy Republic

Democratic Republic

Republic of Madagascar

References

External links

 
 
 

Madagascar
Madagascar